Ur-gar or Ur-nig was the last ensi of Lagash circa 2100 BCE (middle chronology), roughly contemporaneous with the last king of Akkad, Shu-turul.

Ur-gar was a son-in-law of Ur-Baba, and succeeded to Ur-Ningirsu, or Pirigme. Several votive inscriptions are known of him. He was succeeded by the last ruler of the Second Dynasty of Lagash, Nam-mahani.

Only one of his year names is known:

Queen Nininimgina is also known for a dedication to him:

References

Year of birth missing
Year of death missing
22nd-century BC Sumerian kings
Kings of Lagash